Gold repatriation refers to plans of various governments to bring home their gold stored outside the home country.

Many nations use foreign vaults for safe-keeping of part of their gold reserves. In 2014, there was movement by some European states to return gold stored abroad back to the owner country. The central bank of the Netherlands reduced its proportion of gold held by the New York Federal Reserve from 51% to 31%, and Austria and Belgium reviewed the possibility of taking similar measures.

Venezuela 
Before 2012, the Central Bank of Venezuela, Banco Central de Venezuela (BCV), held about 211 tons of its 365 tons of gold reserves in American, European, and Canadian banks. In January 2012, however, Venezuela completed the move of 160 tons of gold bars (valued at about $9 billion) back home. The operation was ordered by President Hugo Chávez in August 2011 and was overseen by Central Bank chair Nelson Merentes.

In early November 2018, the Bank of England in London refused the withdrawal of 14 tons of gold owned by the BCV at the request of top U.S. officials, including Secretary of State Michael Pompeo and National Security Adviser John Bolton, who lobbied their U.K. counterparts to help cut off the people from their overseas assets.

Netherlands 
In 2014, 122.5 tons of Dutch gold reserves were returned to Amsterdam from New York, where they had been stored in a vault of the Federal Reserve Bank of New York; the De Nederlandsche Bank, the Dutch central bank, said that it "felt that in times of financial crisis, it was better to have the gold near at hand."

The Netherlands continues to store gold reserves in New York, Ottawa and London.

Germany 
In January 2013, Deutsche Bundesbank, the German central bank, announced plans to repatriate 300 tons of its 1,500 tonne reserve from the U.S., and 374 tons from France by 2020, in order to store (1,695.3 tons) of its official gold reserves in Frankfurt.

The gold stored in the U.S. was acquired by West Germany during a period of trade surpluses with the U.S. before 1970. The gold was never repatriated to Germany due to fear of invasion by the Soviet Union. In 2013, five tons were repatriated due to logistical difficulties. However, 120 tons in 2014 (35 tons from Paris, 85 tons from New York); a further 210 tons in 2015 (110.5 tons from Paris and 99.5 tons from New York); and finally 200 tons in 2016, were repatriated.

Belgium 
In an interview with Belgium broadcaster VTM Nieuws, Luc Coene, governor of Belgium’s central bank, confirmed that the bank is looking at how they can bring their gold reserves back into the country.

According to IMF data compiled by the World Gold Council, Belgium holds 227.4 metric tons of gold, representing 34.2% of its official foreign reserves. According to reports, most of the gold is held outside of the country with the Bank of England, the Bank of Canada and the Bank for International Settlements.

Switzerland 
Save our Swiss Gold motion was a citizen movement that called for the central bank to hold at least 20 percent of its assets in gold, prohibit selling any gold in future and bring all its reserve of gold back in the country. This referendum was held on November 30, 2014, but was lost.

Austria 
Austria currently holds 80% of their 280 tons of gold in London, 17% in Austria, and 3% in Switzerland. Citing a need for risk diversification, Austria announced they will be repatriating gold from London during 2015. After the repatriation process has completed, 50% of Austria's gold will be held in Austria, 20% in Switzerland, and the remaining 30% in London.

See also 
 Fiat currency
 Gold as investment
 Gold standard
 Moscow gold

References 

Banking
Repatriation
Repatriation